Mercedes-Benz made a series of pre-war supercharged Grand Prix racing engines for their Silver Arrow race cars; between 1934 and 1939. They made two supercharged inline-8 engines; the M25 and M125, and one V12 with two generations; the M154 / M163.

Background
Despite reducing the engine size by roughly half, Daimler engineers soon managed to get more power from the supercharged Straight-8 M25 engine than the maximum 300 hp of the SSK. 

Development of the chassis and the car had allowed to increase capacity to more than 4 litre, and output of the new engine version M25C was well over 400 hp. As the M25 engines became unreliable when enlarged to 4.7-litre and 490 hp, a V12 engine was tested, but it proved too heavy.

The W125's supercharged engine, with 8 cylinders in line (94.0 x 102 mm) and 5,662.85 cc (345.56 CID), attained an output of up to 595 horsepower (444 kW) in race trim. The highest testbed power measured was 637 BHP (646 PS) at 5,800 rpm. It gave 245 BHP (248 PS) at a mere 2,000 rpm. In 1938, the engine capacity of supercharged Grand Prix cars was limited to 3000cc, and the W125 was replaced by the Mercedes-Benz W154.

The W125 was considered the most powerful road racing car ever for about 3 decades, until large capacity, American-built V8 engines in Can-Am sports cars reached similar power in the late 1960s. In Grand Prix racing itself, the figure was not exceeded until the early 1980s (when Grand Prix racing had become known as Formula One), with the appearance of highly powerful turbo-charged engines; such as the Renault EF-Type engine, BMW M12/13, and the Ferrari Tipo 021.

With no regulations limiting engine size, other than the  total car weight limit, Mercedes designed a 5.6 litre engine configured with eight inline cylinders and double overhead camshaft for the W125. Named the M125, the engine was also fitted with a Roots type supercharger producing  of torque at the start of the season. The engines built varied in power, attaining an output between 560 and 640 horsepower (418-477 kW) at 5800 rpm. Fuel used was a custom mix of 40% methyl alcohol, 32% benzene, 24% ethyl alcohol and 4% gasoline light. The engine weighed 222 kg (490 lbs) - approximately 30% of the total weight of the car, and was mounted in the front of the car.

1938 saw changes in the rules, with the maximum limit on weight being replaced with a maximum limit on engine capacity and a minimum weight for the car being introduced; the W125 was no longer eligible for entry without major modification. Instead, Mercedes-Benz developed a new car, the W154, and the W125 was withdrawn from racing.

The M154 engine was created as a result of a rule change by the sports governing body AIACR, which limited supercharged engine capacities to 3000cc. Mercedes' previous car, the supercharged 5700cc W125, was therefore ineligible. The company decided that a new car based on the chassis of the W125 and designed to comply with the new regulations would be preferable to modifying the existing car.

Although using the same chassis design as the 1938 car, a different body was used for the 1939 season and the M154 engine used during 1938 was replaced by the M163. As a result of the new engine, the 1939 car is often mistakenly referred to as a Mercedes-Benz W163.

For the 1938 season, Grand Prix racing's governing body AIACR moved from a formula limited by weight to one by engine capacity. The new regulations allowed a maximum capacity of 3000cc with a supercharger or 4500cc without. This meant Mercedes-Benz's previous car, the supercharged 5700cc W125, was ineligible to continue. Its new car was based on the W125 chassis, with a supercharged 3000cc engine determined after both types had been tested.

The new M154 engine was a 3000cc (2,961.54 cc; 67.0 x 70.0 mm) supercharged V12, attaining an output between 425 and 474 horsepower. In 1939, the 2-stage supercharged version recorded a testbed power of 476 BHP (483 PS) at 7,800 rpm. Each one of these engines reputedly cost 89,700 German reichsmarks in 1938 (US$949,601 today).

Applications
Mercedes-Benz W125
Mercedes-Benz W25
Mercedes-Benz W154
Mercedes-Benz W125 Rekordwagen

References

Mercedes-Benz engines
Straight-eight engines
V12 engines
Engines by model
Gasoline engines by model